Neddy Atieno Okoth (born 8 July 1992), known as Neddy Atieno, is a Kenyan footballer who plays as a forward for Ulinzi and the Kenya women's national team.

International career
Atieno capped for Kenya at senior level during the 2018 Africa Women Cup of Nations qualification.

See also
List of Kenya women's international footballers

References

External links

1992 births
Living people
People from Laikipia County
Kenyan women's footballers
Women's association football forwards
Kenya women's international footballers